Northern Radio of Michigan is a radio broadcasting company which owns seven radio stations in northern Michigan, with offices in Traverse City.

Radio Stations

Music Radio - The Fox FM 
 92.5 WFDX  Atlanta, MI
 100.5 W263CD Boyne City, MI

ESPN Radio - Northern Michigan 
 106.7 WSRT Gaylord, MI
 98.3  W252DA Boyne City, MI

KLT - The Rock Station 
 97.5 WKLT Kalkaska, MI

Station Timeline

References

Michiguide.com - Northern Radio

Radio broadcasting companies of the United States
Companies based in Michigan